Rainer Maria Schröder, (born January 3, 1951, in Rostock), is a German author of adventure fiction for juveniles, mystery thrillers and historical novels for adults.  He also writes under the pseudonym Ashley Carrington and Raymond M. Sheridan.

His books sold more than 6 million copies to date. Rainer Maria Schröder received the Friedrich-Gerstäcker-Preis for his historical novel Abby Lynn - Verbannt ans Ende der Welt in 1988. In 1998 the Federal Agency for Civic Education voted his novel Unter dem Jacarandabaum one of the 100 novels most worth reading of 20th century world literature. The same year he was awarded the 3rd International Eifel-Literaturpreis for Das Geheimnis der weißen Mönche. In 2003 the novel Das Geheimnis des Kartenmachers received both the Literature Award of the Youth Book Jury Moers as well as the distincion "Book of the Month" by the Youth Book committee Göttingen. In 2005 he received the renowned youth book award Buxtehude Bull for the novel Die Lagune der Galeeren.

The works of Rainer Maria Schröder have been translated into more than a dozen languages, among them French, Portuguese, Spanish, Italian, Polish, Turkish, Czech, Slovakian, Latvian, Dutch, Japanese and Russian.

Biography
Rainer Maria Schröder grew up in East Berlin. Shortly before the construction of the Berlin Wall he fled to West Germany with his family, where they lived in a camp for the first year. Later they moved to Dortmund and Düsseldorf, where Schröder completed his Abitur and studied opera singing. Schröder played the guitar in the rock band Union Jack.

At the request of his father, a former head physician at the Berlin Charité, he also aimed for an academic career. After completing a two-year officer training in the German Air Force he worked as a trainee for the newspaper Rheinische Post. In 1974 he took up Law Studies at the University of Cologne. He also read German Philology, Theatre studies, Film- and Television Studies and wrote texts and articles for different newspapers and the broadcasting station WDR. After the publishing house Franz Schneider Verlag bought his first juvenile novel In die Falle gelaufen in 1975, Schröder dropped out of university.

Subsequently, his novels were published by Franz Schneider Verlag, Stalling and Heyne Verlag. He debuted as a playwright in 1977. Schröder worked as an editor for nine month before he became a full-time author. In 1980 he and his wife Helga took up residence at a farm in the south of Virginia at Smith Mountain Lake.

Rainer M. Schröder is also the author of several non-fiction books on music, such as the biography on the band The Scorpions published by Heyne in 1980. Schröder, who is friends with the band, accompanied them on tours in France, England and California and spent several weeks in the recording studio with them.  
Schröder likes to travel and collect information for his adventure novels. Today he lives in Palm Coast/Florida.

His novels are often set in the period between 1100 and 1900 (for example Das Geheimnis des Kartenmachers, Das Vermächtnis des alten Pilgers or Das Kloster der Ketzer). An exception are his novels set in and around World War II, such as Die lange Reise des Jakob Stern. With the two-part Science-Fiction novel Liberty 9 Schröder deviated from his usual genres for the first time. Schröder is also the author of the Kommissar Klicker-series, published as a juvenile book-series and as an audibook-series.

Awards 
1984 Silbernes Schneider- Buch vom Franz-Schneider Verlag
1988 Friedrich-Gerstäcker-Preis for Abby-Lynn - Verbannt ans Ende der Welt
1993 Goldenes Schneider- Buch from the Franz-Schneider Verlag
1998 3. international Eifel- Literaturpreis for Das Geheimnis der weißen Mönche
1998 Book of the Month - Prize for Mein Feuer brennt im Land der fallenden Wasser from the Deutschen Akademie für Kinder- und Jugendbücher
1999 JuBu Buch des Monats for Felix Faber - übers Meer und durch die Wildnis
2003 Moerser Jugendbuchpreis for Das Geheimnis des Kartenmachers
2003 Book of the Month - Prize for Das Geheimnis des Kartenmachers from the Arbeitsgemeinschaft Jugendbuch Göttingen
2004 Buxtehuder Bulle for Die Lagune der Galeeren
2016 Spandauer Jugendliteraturpreis für Himmel ohne Sterne

Bibliography

as Rainer M. Schröder

Pseudonym Ashley Carrington

Audiobooks
 Abby Lynn. Verbannt ans Ende der Welt, Der Hörverlag, 
 Abby Lynn. Verraten und verfolgt, Der Hörverlag, 
 Abby Lynn. Verschollen in der Wildnis, Der Hörverlag, 
 Das Geheimnis der weißen Mönche, Der Hörverlag, 
 Das Geheimnis des Kartenmachers, Der Hörverlag, 
 Das Vermächtnis des alten Pilgers, Der Hörverlag, 
 Die Bruderschaft vom Heiligen Gral. Das Amulett der Wüstenkrieger, Goya libre, Hamburg 2007, 
 Die Bruderschaft vom Heiligen Gral. Das Labyrinth der schwarzen Abtei, Goya libre, Hamburg 2008, 
 Die Bruderschaft vom Heiligen Gral. Der Fall von Akkon, Goya libre, Hamburg 2006, 
 Die Judaspapiere, Der Hörverlag, 
 Die Lagune der Galeeren, Goya libre, Hamburg 2007, 
 Die Medici-Chroniken 1. Hüter der Macht, Goya libre, Hamburg 2010, 
 Die Medici-Chroniken 2. Der Pate von Florenz, Goya libre, Hamburg 2010, 
 Tage der Finsternis, Goya libre, Hamburg 2009,

References

External links 
 
Official homepage of the author
Author page on the website of his agency AVA international

1951 births
Living people
German children's writers
German crime fiction writers
German male novelists